The 1934–35 New York Rangers season was the franchise's ninth season. During the regular season, the Rangers finished in third place in the American Division with 50 points, and qualified for the playoffs. In the first round of the playoffs, the Rangers defeated the Montreal Canadiens in a two-game total goal series, 6–5, to advance to the NHL semi-finals. There, New York lost 5–4 in another two-game total goal series to the Montreal Maroons.

Regular season

Final standings

Record vs. opponents

Schedule and results

|- align="center" bgcolor="#FFBBBB"
| 1 || 10 || @ St. Louis Eagles || 4–2 || 0–1–0
|- align="center" bgcolor="#FFBBBB"
| 2 || 15 || @ Detroit Red Wings || 8–2 || 0–2–0
|- align="center" bgcolor="#CCFFCC"
| 3 || 18 || St. Louis Eagles || 5–0 || 1–2–0
|- align="center" bgcolor="#CCFFCC"
| 4 || 22 || Detroit Red Wings || 4 – 3 OT || 2–2–0
|- align="center" bgcolor="#FFBBBB"
| 5 || 25 || @ New York Americans || 3–1 || 2–3–0
|- align="center" bgcolor="#FFBBBB"
| 6 || 27 || Montreal Canadiens || 3–2 || 2–4–0
|-

|- align="center" bgcolor="#FFBBBB"
| 7 || 1 || Montreal Maroons || 5–2 || 2–5–0
|- align="center" bgcolor="#FFBBBB"
| 8 || 4 || @ Montreal Canadiens || 5–3 || 2–6–0
|- align="center" bgcolor="#CCFFCC"
| 9 || 8 || @ Toronto Maple Leafs || 5–2 || 3–6–0
|- align="center" bgcolor="#FFBBBB"
| 10 || 9 || @ Chicago Black Hawks || 4–0 || 3–7–0
|- align="center" bgcolor="#FFBBBB"
| 11 || 11 || Toronto Maple Leafs || 8–4 || 3–8–0
|- align="center" bgcolor="#CCFFCC"
| 12 || 16 || Boston Bruins || 2–1 || 4–8–0
|- align="center" bgcolor="#FFBBBB"
| 13 || 18 || @ Boston Bruins || 5–3 || 4–9–0
|- align="center" bgcolor="#FFBBBB"
| 14 || 20 || Chicago Black Hawks || 4–1 || 4–10–0
|- align="center" bgcolor="#CCFFCC"
| 15 || 22 || @ Montreal Maroons || 2–1 || 5–10–0
|- align="center" bgcolor="#CCFFCC"
| 16 || 25 || New York Americans || 3–1 || 6–10–0
|- align="center" bgcolor="white"
| 17 || 30 || Boston Bruins || 0 – 0 OT || 6–10–1
|-

|- align="center" bgcolor="#FFBBBB"
| 18 || 1 || @ Boston Bruins || 5–2 || 6–11–1
|- align="center" bgcolor="#CCFFCC"
| 19 || 3 || Detroit Red Wings || 3–2 || 7–11–1
|- align="center" bgcolor="white"
| 20 || 8 || Montreal Maroons || 1 – 1 OT || 7–11–2
|- align="center" bgcolor="#CCFFCC"
| 21 || 12 || @ New York Americans || 3–1 || 8–11–2
|- align="center" bgcolor="#CCFFCC"
| 22 || 13 || St. Louis Eagles || 3–2 || 9–11–2
|- align="center" bgcolor="white"
| 23 || 15 || New York Americans || 1 – 1 OT || 9–11–3
|- align="center" bgcolor="#CCFFCC"
| 24 || 20 || Montreal Canadiens || 7–1 || 10–11–3
|- align="center" bgcolor="#CCFFCC"
| 25 || 22 || @ Montreal Canadiens || 7–0 || 11–11–3
|- align="center" bgcolor="white"
| 26 || 24 || Chicago Black Hawks || 3 – 3 OT || 11–11–4
|- align="center" bgcolor="#CCFFCC"
| 27 || 27 || @ New York Americans || 4–2 || 12–11–4
|- align="center" bgcolor="#CCFFCC"
| 28 || 29 || Toronto Maple Leafs || 7–5 || 13–11–4
|- align="center" bgcolor="#CCFFCC"
| 29 || 31 || @ Toronto Maple Leafs || 3–2 || 14–11–4
|-

|- align="center" bgcolor="#CCFFCC"
| 30 || 3 || Detroit Red Wings || 5–3 || 15–11–4
|- align="center" bgcolor="#CCFFCC"
| 31 || 5 || @ Montreal Maroons || 5–4 || 16–11–4
|- align="center" bgcolor="#FFBBBB"
| 32 || 7 || New York Americans || 6–4 || 16–12–4
|- align="center" bgcolor="#CCFFCC"
| 33 || 10 || @ Chicago Black Hawks || 2–1 || 17–12–4
|- align="center" bgcolor="#CCFFCC"
| 34 || 12 || @ St. Louis Eagles || 5–1 || 18–12–4
|- align="center" bgcolor="#CCFFCC"
| 35 || 14 || Toronto Maple Leafs || 3–0 || 19–12–4
|- align="center" bgcolor="#FFBBBB"
| 36 || 16 || @ Toronto Maple Leafs || 5–1 || 19–13–4
|- align="center" bgcolor="#CCFFCC"
| 37 || 17 || @ Detroit Red Wings || 5 – 3 OT || 20–13–4
|- align="center" bgcolor="#CCFFCC"
| 38 || 19 || St. Louis Eagles || 2–1 || 21–13–4
|- align="center" bgcolor="white"
| 39 || 24 || Boston Bruins || 0 – 0 OT || 21–13–5
|- align="center" bgcolor="#FFBBBB"
| 40 || 26 || @ Montreal Maroons || 3–1 || 21–14–5
|- align="center" bgcolor="#FFBBBB"
| 41 || 28 || Montreal Maroons || 5–2 || 21–15–5
|-

|- align="center" bgcolor="#FFBBBB"
| 42 || 5 || @ Boston Bruins || 3–1 || 21–16–5
|- align="center" bgcolor="#FFBBBB"
| 43 || 7 || @ Detroit Red Wings || 6–1 || 21–17–5
|- align="center" bgcolor="#CCFFCC"
| 44 || 9 || @ St. Louis Eagles || 5–1 || 22–17–5
|- align="center" bgcolor="white"
| 45 || 10 || @ Chicago Black Hawks || 1 – 1 OT || 22–17–6
|- align="center" bgcolor="#FFBBBB"
| 46 || 12 || Montreal Canadiens || 4–3 || 22–18–6
|- align="center" bgcolor="#FFBBBB"
| 47 || 14 || @ Montreal Canadiens || 5–4 || 22–19–6
|- align="center" bgcolor="#FFBBBB"
| 48 || 17 || Chicago Black Hawks || 5–2 || 22–20–6
|-

Playoffs

Key:  Win  Loss

Player statistics
Skaters

Goaltenders

|}

†Denotes player spent time with another team before joining Rangers. Stats reflect time with Rangers only.
‡Traded mid-season. Stats reflect time with Rangers only.

Awards and records

Transactions

References

New York Rangers seasons
New York Rangers
New York Rangers
New York Rangers
New York Rangers
Madison Square Garden
1930s in Manhattan